The 1981 U.S. Clay Court Championships was a men's Grand Prix and women's Toyota Series tennis tournament held in Indianapolis in the United States and played on outdoor clay courts. It was the 13th edition of the tournament and was held from August 3 through August 9, 1981. Second-seeded José Luis Clerc and top-seeded Andrea Jaeger won the singles titles.

Finals

Men's singles

 José Luis Clerc defeated  Ivan Lendl 4–6, 6–4, 6–2
 It was Clerc's 6th title of the year and the 16th of his career.

Women's singles

 Andrea Jaeger defeated  Virginia Ruzici 6–1, 6–0
 It was Jaeger's 3rd title of the year and the 7th of her career.

Men's doubles

 Kevin Curren /  Steve Denton defeated  Raúl Ramírez /  Van Winitsky 6–3, 5–7, 7–5
 It was Curren's 2nd title of the year and the 5th of his career. It was Denton's 2nd title of the year and the 6th of his career.

Women's doubles

 JoAnne Russell /  Virginia Ruzici defeated  Sue Barker /  Paula Smith 6–2, 6–2
 It was Russell's 1st title of the year and the 2nd of her career. It was Ruzici's 1st title of the year and the 12th of her career.

References

External links 

 
U.S. Clay Court Championships
U.S. Clay Court Championships
U.S. Clay Court Championships
U.S. Clay Court Championships
U.S. Clay Court Championships